Gymnostachyum ceylanicum is a small plant endemic to Sri Lanka. Plants grow to heights of 5-15 centimeters, with simple leaves that are opposite, and racemes of light-purple tubular flowers.

Synonyms
 Cryptophragmium ceylanicum Kuntze

References

 Compan. Bot. Mag. 2: 311 1837.
 The Plant List
 JSTOR

Acanthaceae
Plants described in 1837